The Dornier Do H Falke was a German single-seat fighter, designed by Claude Dornier and built by Dornier Flugzeugwerke. Although an advanced design for its time, being evaluated by the United States Navy as the Wright WP-1, it did not go into production.

Development
The company started to design a prototype fighter in the early 1920s, based on earlier wartime designs like the Zeppelin-Lindau D.I. It was an all-metal high-wing cantilever monoplane, with the wing above the fuselage on four small struts. It had a conventional cantilever tail unit and a fixed tailskid landing gear. The pilot had an open cockpit just behind the trailing edge of the wing. The aircraft was powered by a Hispano-Suiza piston engine located in the nose. Two aircraft were built by the Swiss subsidiary of Dornier and three by S.D.C.M.P. in Italy, to avoid restrictions on military aircraft production in Germany. It first flew on 1 November 1922, but failed to go into production. One of the Falkes was converted to a floatplane in 1923, powered by a 261 kW (350 hp) BMW IVa V-12 engine, as the Dornier Seefalke.

One Seefalke was shipped to the United States of America by the Wright Aeronautical Company, who fitted it with a licence-built Wright-Hisso H-3 engine. It was evaluated by the United States Navy with the designation Wright WP-1. It performed well, but the Navy considered the monoplane fighter too advanced for its needs.

Operators

United States Navy

Specifications (Dornier-Wright WP-1)

See also

Notes

Bibliography
The Illustrated Encyclopedia of Aircraft, (Part Work 1982-1985), Orbis Publishing
Andrade, John. U.S. Military Aircraft Designations and Serials since 1909, Midland Counties Publications, 1979, .
Swanborough, Gordon and Bowers, Peter M. United States Navy Aircraft since 1911. London: Putnam. Second Edition, 1976. .

1920s German fighter aircraft
Do H
Wright aircraft
Single-engined tractor aircraft
Parasol-wing aircraft
Aircraft first flown in 1922